The 2016 North Korean floods began in late-August 2016 as a consequence of Typhoon Lionrock, killing at least 525 people, destroying more than 35,000 homes, and leaving over 100,000 people homeless, mainly in the North Hamgyong Province. The floods occurred when the Tumen River, near the borders with China and Russia, broke its banks, according to the United Nations Office for the Coordination of Humanitarian Affairs and Red Cross.

A UN official in North Korea said the scale of the disaster was "beyond anything experienced by local officials".

According to a statement published on 11 September 2016, by the Korean Central News Agency (KCNA), North Korea's official state media, the country's northeast has been affected by the "heaviest downpour" since 1945, with "tens of thousands" of buildings destroyed and people left homeless and "suffering from great hardship".

Typhoon Lionrock

Lionrock merged with a low-pressure system and resulted in very heavy rains over a three-day period (August 29–31) in North Korea, with as much as 12.6 in (320 mm) deluging one county in the province of North Hamgyong. In Hoeryong, a number of school teachers died while trying to carry the portraits of Kim Il-sung and Kim Jong-il to safety during the floods, resulting in children being orphaned.

Response
In response to the floods, the North Korean government sent workers and the Korean People's Army to clear roads and restore communications in the hardest hit areas. About 1,000 volunteers from the local Red Cross chapter helped local workers in search and rescue missions. The agency had relief supplies for about 20,000 people, including tarpaulins, tents, kitchen sets, and water purification tablets. Red Cross workers coordinated with members of the international delegation between September 3–6, resulting in increased resources for health services. The World Food Programme provided emergency food rations for 140,000 people. The European Union donated 300,000 euros in flood relief.

See also

 2016 Pacific typhoon season
 2006 North Korean floods
 2007 North Korean floods 	
 2012 North Korean floods
 2018 North Korean floods

References 	

North Korean floods
2016 in North Korea
2016 natural disasters
August 2016 events in Asia
September 2016 events in Asia
Floods in North Korea
2016 disasters in North Korea